Deon Dreyer (7 August 1974 – 17 December 1994) was a South African recreational scuba diver who died in Bushman's Hole in South Africa. Cave diver David Shaw died more than 10 years later while attempting to retrieve Dreyer's body.

Life
Dreyer's father, Theo (who owns a business that sells and services two-way radios) and mother, Marie, raised him in the town of Vereeniging, about 35 miles south of Johannesburg. Dreyer designed "obscenely loud car stereos", had a passion for diving, and loved adventure, (e.g., hunting, racing a souped-up car, and motorcycling).

Outside Magazines Tim Zimmerman reports:

Death
Dreyer drowned on 17 December 1994, aged 20, during a practice dive. He was helping a team, assembled by Nuno Gomes, set up conditions for a deep technical dive scheduled to take place later that week. They conjectured he had probably lost consciousness either because of oxygen toxicity or hypercapnia induced by the high work-rate of breathing at depth.

Two weeks after Dreyer's death, Theo hired a small, remotely operated sub used by the De Beers mining company. It found Dreyer's dive helmet on the cenote floor, but there was no sign of his body.

Commemoration
Dreyer's parents erected a plaque on a rock wall above the Bushman's Hole entry pool, in memory of their son. In Phillip Finch's book Diving into Darkness: A True Story of Death and Survival, it was suggested that one of the reasons Dreyer's death created such an impression on the cave diving community was because of the plaque.  The bodies of most other divers who die, even whilst cave diving, are recovered.  However, for many years it was assumed Dreyer's body would never be recovered from the cave because it was simply too deep, but the plaque was a continual reminder to cave divers that his body lay within.

Recovery of body
On 8 January 2005, Shaw tried to recover the body, but died in the attempt. Shaw's close friend and support diver, Don Shirley, also nearly died and was left with permanent damage that has impaired his balance. On 12 January 2005, while others were recovering Shaw's technical equipment, they discovered the bodies of both Dreyer and Shaw had floated up close to the surface. Both bodies were then recovered.

See also

References

 

1974 births
1994 deaths
Deaths by drowning
Place of birth missing
Sport deaths in South Africa
South African underwater divers
Underwater diving deaths
Deaths from hypercapnia
People from Vereeniging